Wejo is British connected vehicle data start-up founded by entrepreneur Richard Barlow and is headquartered in Greater Manchester, England. Wejo collects in near-real-time 14.6 billion data points and analyzes 66 million journeys across a network of 10.7 million live vehicles from a supply base of over 50 million connected vehicles. The Company offers a trading platform for connected car data and analytics. Wejo serves customers worldwide and was founded in 2013.

The company, which is backed by General Motors, has recently gone through SPAC merger. This merger is set to raise $330m for Wejo including $230m from special purpose acquisition company Virtuoso and another $125m referred to as Private Investment in Public Equity (PIPE).

History
Wejo was founded in 2013 above a Greek Restauant in Manchester. Wejo, stands for “we journey,” and at start-up it raised $157 million according to PitchBook from such investors as General Motors, which acquired a significant stake in 2019, German auto supplier Hella, DIP Capital and the British government.

In November 2019, Wejo opened a second UK office in the centre of Manchester's technology and enterprise zone.

Wejo has participated in 3 rounds of funding since it was founded and has raised $120.2M in capital. Based on current valuations, it is classed as one of the UK’s prospective billion dollar-valued firms.

Partnerships
In June 2021 it was announced that Wejo would partner with Waycare to deliver a joint offering to 20 locations across the United States, with Wejo’s data supplementing Waycare’s existing data sources, providing traffic managers with a comprehensive understanding of conditions and the ability to not only detect and predict incidents, but also respond faster and more effectively based on real-world, near real-time data in a single platform from which they can all collaborate.

On the 29th June 2021, it was announced that Microsoft and Japanese insurance giant Sompo had joined Palantir in partnering with Wejo.

Technology

Wejo streams high volumes of anonymized vehicle data direct from the automotive manufacturer in real-time, before cleansing, normalizing, and processing it. It also standardizes the data across data sources to ensure consistency. The data is delivered from the vehicle source to the end-user customer within 32 seconds.

Wejo has the largest number of accessible connected vehicles on its platform, with 42 million in 2019. To date, Wejo has curated over 140 billion miles of data.

References

Companies established in 2013
Companies based in Manchester